Conner House may refer to:

in the United States
(by state, then city)

 Wesley O. Conner House, Cave Spring, Georgia, listed on the National Register of Historic Places (NRHP) in Floyd County, Georgia
 William Conner House, Fishers, Indiana, NRHP-listed
 George Conner House, Fredericktown, Kentucky, listed on the NRHP in Washington County, Kentucky
 Donald L. Conner House, Midland, Michigan, listed on the NRHP in Midland County, Michigan
 Alexander Conner House, Xenia, Ohio, NRHP-listed
 Dr. Beadie E. and Willie R. Conner House and Park, Austin, Texas, listed on the NRHP in Travis County, Texas
 Sweeney-Conner Cabin, near Appomattox, Virginia, NRHP district contributing property
 Conner House, Manassas Park, Virginia, NRHP-listed

See also
 Connor House (disambiguation)